Mesoclemmys raniceps is a side-necked turtle found in the Amazon basin and Orinoco basin. Little is known about the turtle's life cycle, but there is evidence that the females can lay a clutch of 4-8 eggs several times in the year. Males are usually smaller than females in length. Males can be distinguished from females by the prominent white scales they have on the external border of their skin which cover the tibia. Mesoclemmys raniceps can be identified by the black stripe on each side of their head which extends from the snout through the eyes and ends at the exterior end, the tympani.

References

5. Vogt, R. C., Franco, J. A. G., Fernandes, T. undefined, & Cunha, F. undefined. (2019, March 29). Reproductive Biology and Hatchling Morphology of the Amazon Toad-headed Turtle (Mesoclemmys raniceps) (Testudines: Chelidae), with Notes on Species Morphology and Taxonomy of the Mesoclemmys Group. Vol. 18 issue 2. 195–209.

raniceps
Turtles of South America
Fauna of the Amazon
Reptiles of Bolivia
Reptiles of Brazil
Reptiles of Colombia
Reptiles of Ecuador
Reptiles of Peru
Reptiles of Venezuela
Reptiles described in 1856
Taxa named by John Edward Gray